Sanjar Shaakhmedov (Russian: Санжар Шоахмедов; born 23 September 1990) is an Uzbekistani professional footballer who plays as a midfielder for Malaysia Super League club Terengganu Darul Iman and the Uzbekistan national team.

Career

Lokomotiv Tashkent (2015–2017) 
Sanjar started his professional football career at Lokomotiv Tashkent in 2015, making his debut in a 3-1 defeat against Al Hilal for the AFC Champions League on 25 February 2015, and scoring his first goal in a 5-0 victory against Al-Sadd on 8 April 2015.

Al-Sailiya 
Sanjar signed for Al-Sailiya for €500 thousand on 16 January 2017, making his first match on the club in a 1-0 victory against Umm Salal for Stars League on 20 January 2017, and scoring his first goal in a 1-1 draw against El-Jaish on 2 February 2017.

Lokomotiv Tashkent (2017–2019) 
Sanjar came back to Lokomotiv for €300 thousand on 7 August 2017, making his comeback match in a 4-0 victory against Sogdiana for O'Zbekiston Superligasi on 12 August 2017 and scoring his first goal for the season in a 3-1 victory against FK Obod on 29 September 2017.

Terengganu FC 
Sanjar signed with Terengganu FC on 4 January 2019. He debuted against PKNS FC on 1 February 2019. The match ended 1-1.

International career

Uzbekistan (2015-2016) 
Sanjar was called up to the Uzbekistan national team for the 2018 FIFA World Cup qualification, but he stayed on the bench for 7 out of the 8 matches played by the squad. For the match against Yemen, he wasn't in the starting lineup, nor in the bench.

References 

1990 births
Living people
Uzbekistani footballers
Uzbekistani expatriate footballers
Uzbekistan international footballers
Association football midfielders
PFC Lokomotiv Tashkent players
Al-Sailiya SC players
Terengganu FC players
Uzbekistan Super League players
Qatar Stars League players
Malaysia Super League players
Expatriate footballers in Qatar
Expatriate footballers in Malaysia
Uzbekistani expatriate sportspeople in Qatar
Uzbekistani expatriate sportspeople in Malaysia